Trouble at the Top was a business-based BBC television fly on the wall documentary broadcast on BBC2. The series focussed on business failings or disputes between business people. Mainly the series depicted half-hour documentaries on large businesses such as Sainsbury's or privately owned ventures. It also featured a number of celebrity-based editions such as Chef Gordon Ramsay, supermodel Jodie Kidd and even pop group Bucks Fizz. The series ran for 11 seasons from 1997 to 2007. 

The 2005 movie Kinky Boots was inspired by an episode about W.J. Brooks Ltd, a family-controlled Earls Barton, Northamptonshire shoe factory whose 'Divine' product line consisted of traditionally feminine footwear marketed towards men. Trouble at the Top also reportedly inspired TV producer Mark Burnett to make "The Apprentice" which debuted in the USA in 2004.

A spin off four-part series, Trouble at the Big Top, followed developments at the Millennium Dome in a similar style.

References

External links
 

1997 British television series debuts
2000s British television series
2010s British television series
BBC television documentaries